Major General William Brian "Digger" James  (14 May 1930 – 16 October 2015) was an Australian soldier and military physician who served in the Australian Army during the Korean War and the Vietnam War.

Early life
William James was born in May 1930 in Shepparton, the son of Thomas James, a local orchardist who had emigrated from Ireland. He was educated at Grahamvale State School and Shepparton High School. His lifelong nickname "Digger" pre-dated his military career, having been applied when someone placed a slouch hat on his head at the age of ten months.

Military and medical career

Duntroon training
At the completion of his schooling, James attended the Royal Military College, Duntroon, from which he graduated in 1951.

Korean War
Posted to the 1st Battalion, Royal Australian Regiment (1RAR), in 1952 James served as a platoon commander during the Korean War. On 7 November, during the Second Battle of Maryang San (Hill 355), he led a patrol of twelve men to capture an enemy outpost. The group inadvertently entered a Canadian minefield, resulting in the death of one soldier and four injuries, including the loss of James's left foot. Using a shoelace as a torniquet, James then organised the evacuation of his men from the battlefield, radioing for help and waiting three hours before being evacuated himself due to a shortage of stretchers.

He underwent surgery at an American MASH unit in Korea, before being flown to Kure, Japan where he spent four months being treated at the British Commonwealth General Hospital. In late December, he was repatriated to Australia where he spent fourteen months in recovery at the Royal General Hospital, Heidelberg.

On 3 March 1953, James was awarded the Military Cross for gallant and distinguished service in Korea due to his actions that day. The citation for his MC read:

Medical training
Upon his release from hospital, James transferred to the Royal Australian Armoured Corps. He was posted to a training regiment at the School of Armour, serving as the regiment's adjutant before taking up a position as cadre staff in the 12th/16th Hunter River Lancers, a reserve cavalry regiment, based at Muswellbrook.

His experiences in military medical facilities sparked an interest in the field, and in 1957, James left the Army to study medicine at the Sydney Medical School, from which he graduated in 1963 with a Bachelor of Medicine and a Bachelor of Surgery (MBBS). After serving his hospital residency, James rejoined the Army as a medical officer for the Royal Australian Army Medical Corps (RAAMC).

Vietnam War
Promoted to major, James was posted to command the 8th Field Ambulance in South Vietnam during the Vietnam War from January 1968 to January 1969. He also served as senior medical officer for the 1st Australian Task Force in Nui Dat over the same period. He used his personal experience as a wounded soldier in Korea to inspire and encourage other patients, particularly those injured by land mines.

In April 1969 he became a Member of the Order of the British Empire (MBE) in the military division for his Vietnam service.

Post-war service
In 1971, James served with a British St John's Ambulance medical relief team during the aftermath of the Biafran Civil War in Nigeria, for which he became and Officer of the Order of Saint John.

Returning to Australia, James was appointed Queensland state director of Army Medical Services from 1971 to 1975, then AMS director at Army Headquarters from 1975 to 1981. In 1981, he was promoted to major general, and served as director-general of Army Health Services until his retirement from the army in 1984.

After retirement
From 1993 to 1997, James was National President of the Returned Services League (RSL). From 1993 to 2000, he sat on the council of the Australian War Memorial, serving as the council's president from 1999 to 2000. He was also chairman of the Australian Light Horse Association, and his face was used as the model for one of the soldiers on the Light Horse memorial in Beersheba, Israel which he unveiled in 2008, and was funded by his childhood friend, Richard Pratt.

An avowed monarchist, James was a member of Australians for Constitutional Monarchy (ACM), and a delegate to the Australian Constitutional Convention 1998.

Personal life
James died on 16 October 2015. He was married for more than 60 years to Barbara, with whom he had four children.

Honours and awards

References

External links
Service Record on Nominal Roll of Australian Veterans of the Korean War
Service Record on Nominal Roll of Vietnam Veterans

1930 births
2015 deaths
Military personnel from Victoria (Australia)
Australian generals
Australian military doctors
Australian military personnel of the Korean War
Australian military personnel of the Vietnam War
Australian amputees
Companions of the Order of Australia
Officers of the Order of Australia
Australian Members of the Order of the British Empire
Australian recipients of the Military Cross
Officers of the Order of St John
Fellows of the Royal Australasian College of Surgeons
Sydney Medical School alumni
Royal Military College, Duntroon graduates
Australian monarchists
Delegates to the Australian Constitutional Convention 1998
Australian people of Irish descent